Fuck off may also refer to:

 Fuck Off, an art exhibition that ran alongside the Shanghai Biennial Festival in 2000
 "Fuck Off", a 1977 song by Wayne County & the Electric Chairs
 "Fuck Off", the preliminary title of "Le Freak", a 1978 song by Chic
 "Fuck Off", a song by Kid Rock featuring Eminem from the album Devil Without a Cause
"Fuck Off", a song by Tierra Whack from the album Whack World
 Fuck Off!, a 1994 EP by Shaggy 2 Dope containing its title track

See also
 Fuck (word)
 Fuck It (disambiguation)
 Fuck You (disambiguation)

English phrases